Zodion is a large genus of flies from the family Conopidae.

Species
Zodion abdominale Say, 1823
Zodion abitus Adams, 1903
Zodion aenescens Aczel, 1950
Zodion americanum Wiedemann, 1830
Zodion anale Kröber, 1915
Zodion auricaudatum Williston, 1892
Zodion bellum Camras, 2004
Zodion bicolor Adams, 1903
Zodion caesium Becker, 1908
Zodion californicum Camras, 1954
Zodion carceli Robineau-Desvoidy, 1830
Zodion chvalai Camras, 2004
Zodion cinereiventre Van Duzee, 1927
Zodion cinereum (Fabricius, 1794)
Zodion cyanescens Camras, 1943
Zodion erythrurum Rondani, 1865
Zodion fulvifrons Say, 1823
Zodion intermedium Banks, 1916
Zodion kroeberi Szilády, 1926
Zodion malayense Stuke, 2004
Zodion neocaledonicum Stuke, 2014
Zodion nigrifrons Kröber, 1915
Zodion nigritarse Strobl, 1902
Zodion notatum (Meigen, 1804)
Zodion obliquefasciatum (Macquart, 1846)
Zodion parvum Adams, 1903
Zodion perlongum Coquillett, 1902
Zodion pictulum Williston, 1885
Zodion rossi Camras, 1957
Zodion scapulare Adams, 1903
Zodion triste Bigot, 1887
Zodion zebrinum Bigot, 1887

References

Conopidae
Muscomorph flies of Europe
Diptera of South America
Diptera of North America
Diptera of Australasia
Conopoidea genera
Taxa named by Pierre André Latreille